Brian W. Stewart (born October 25, 1957) is a Republican member of the Illinois Senate representing the 45th District since his election in 2018. The 45th District encompasses all of Stephenson, Jo Daviess, and Ogle counties as well as portions of Winnebago, DeKalb, LaSalle, Lee, Whiteside, and Carroll.
Previously, he was a member of the Illinois House of Representatives, representing the 89th District from his appointment in 2013 to 2018. Stewart announced in January 2022 that he would not be seeking re-election to the Illinois Senate.

Early life, education, and career
Stewart is a native of Freeport, IL. He attended Freeport High School, Stewart enlisted in the United States Army.  He served on Active Duty as a Military Policeman and as a Military Police Investigator and was Honorably Discharged.  He then was hired as a Deputy Sheriff with the Stephenson County Sheriff's Police.

Stewart began the first of his small businesses in 1987 on his kitchen table.  Today, he owns several businesses and is a major employer in Northwest Illinois. Of the businesses he owns, Stewart & Associates Inc. is the primary. Stewart & Associates Inc. has various branches, and provides a multitude of services — such as security, private investigations, background investigations, civil processing, and more.

As the Chairman of the Stephenson County Republican Party, he supported the presidential campaign of former New York City Mayor Rudy Giuliani during the 2008 Republican Party presidential primaries.

Illinois House of Representatives
Jim Sacia announced that he would be stepping down from the Illinois House of Representatives in September 2013.  Brian W. Stewart was appointed to replace Jim Sacia by the Republican Central Committee.  Stewart was sworn in at a public gathering at the Stephenson County Courthouse on October 4, 2013.

Illinois Senate
Stewart was elected to succeed retiring Senator Tim Bivins. He was sworn in early on December 5, 2018, to represent the 45th District, which encompasses all of Stephenson, Jo Daviess, and Ogle counties as well as portions of Winnebago, DeKalb, LaSalle, Lee, Whiteside, and Carroll.

Committees 
Pensions (Minority Spokesperson); Agriculture; Energy and Public Utilities; Financial Institutions; Healthcare Access and Availability; Judiciary; Veterans Affairs; Appropriations; App-Constitutional Offices (Sub-Minority Spokesperson); App- General Services (Sub-Minority Spokesperson); App-Human Services; App-Judiciary (Sub-Minority Spokesperson); Judiciary- Torts; Redistricting- Northern Illinois.

References

External links
Official Legislative Website, http://senatorstewart.com
Citizens for Brian W. Stewart Website
Representative Brian Stewart at the Illinois General Assembly

Republican Party members of the Illinois House of Representatives
Living people
People from Freeport, Illinois
1957 births
21st-century American politicians